Maha Haj (Arabic: مها حاج; born in 1970) is an Israeli-born Palestinian film director and screenwriter.

Life and career 
Haj was born in Nazareth, Israel. She was educated in the Baptist Christian school in Nazareth, though both her parents were communist activists. Under her father's influence she began studying pharmacy science, but after year switched to literature, and completed her BA in English and Arabic literature at the Hebrew University of Jerusalem, and her MA in language and literature at Haifa University. She began working as a teacher, but was more interested in her art and writing, which she practiced in her free time.

She began her cinematic career working as an set designer, script doctor, and art director on such films as Elia Suleiman's The Time That Remains (2009), Ziad Doueiri's The Attack (2012); followed by Adi Adouan's Arabani (2014) and Rafael Najari's Over the HIlltop (2014).

In 2009, she wrote and directed the short film Burtuqal, which was released to critical acclaim, and was screened at many international film festivals, and then the documentary film Within These Walls (2010).

She achieved international recognition in 2016 with her film Personal Affairs, which had its international premiere at the Cannes Film Festival, in the Un Certain Regard section. She both wrote and directed the film, which won Best Feature Film at the Haifa International Film Festival. In their reasoning, the judges wrote: "It is a creation that is entirely love of humankind, fluent and funny, captivating and kindhearted, a contemporary human mosaic, both local and universal."

Haj detailed the difficulties, both logistically and emotionally, she faced getting public funding though the Israeli Film Fund (IFF) for her film Personal Affairs. Then Israeli Minister of Culture Limor Livnat established regulations that require any project receiving public funds to be presented as strictly an Israeli feature, not as a Palestinian-Israeli or Palestinian film, causing difficulties for filmmakers like Haj who want to highlight their Palestinian and/or dual identities. Ultimately, the IFF backed the project after Haj and her producer agreed to the terms to release the movie as an Israeli feature.

In 2022, Mediterranean Fever, which she wrote and directed, premiered at the 2022 Cannes Film Festival within the Un certain regard section, and won the Prize for Best Screenplay.

Filmography

Awards and nominations

|-
| 2016
| Personal Affairs
| Best Film, Haifa International Film Festival 
| 
| 
|-
| 2016
| Personal Affairs
| Un Certain Regard, Cannes Film Festival
| 
| 
|-
| 2016
| Personal Affairs
| Caméra d'Or, Cannes Film Festival
| 
| 
|-
| 2016
| Personal Affairs
| Best Film, International Film Festival of India
| 
| 
|-
| 2016
| Personal Affairs
| Special Mention – International Feature Film, Zurich Film Festival
| 
|
|-
| 2016
| Personal Affairs
| Golden Eye – Best International Feature Film, Zurich Film Festival
| 
|
|-
| 2016
| Personal Affairs
| Critics' Award, Montpellier Film Festival
| 
| 
|-
| 2016
| Personal Affairs
| Best Debut Feature, Philadelphia Film Festival
| 
| 
|-
| 2022
|  Mediterranean Fever
| Un Certain Regard Best Screenplay Prize, 2022 Cannes Film Festival
| 
|

References

External links 
 
 

Israeli women film directors
Israeli female screenwriters
1970 births
Living people
Israeli film directors
Arab-Israeli film directors
People from Nazareth
Hebrew University of Jerusalem alumni
University of Haifa alumni